The Roman Catholic Diocese of Laredo is a Roman Catholic diocese located in Laredo, Texas.  It was founded on July 3, 2000. The San Agustin Cathedral is the Mother Church of the Diocese of Laredo. James Anthony Tamayo is the first and current bishop of the diocese. It covers an area of 10,905 sq. mi. and has 344,711 members. It has 48 priests, 33 deacons, 32 parishes, and 17 missions.

History
On July 3, 2000, the Diocese of Laredo was created by  Pope John Paul II and entrusted to Bishop James Anthony Tamayo, a former auxiliary bishop of Galveston-Houston.  The Laredo diocese included portions of the Roman Catholic Diocese of Corpus Christi and the Roman Catholic Archdiocese of San Antonio, namely the counties of Dimmit, Jim Hogg, La Salle, Maverick, Webb, Zapata, and Zavala. On August 9, 2000, the Apostolic Letters erecting the diocese and installing Bishop Tamayo were formally read by the Apostolic Nuncio in the presence of 25 bishops, over 200 priests, 50 deacons, and 3000 other faithful who gathered for the occasion at the Laredo Civic Center.

Bishops
 James Anthony Tamayo (2000–present)

Parishes
Parishes of the Diocese of Laredo that were formerly part of the Archdiocese of San Antonio. In the order of their founding, they are:

1859-Our Lady of Refuge, Eagle Pass, Texas
1881-Our Lady of Guadalupe, Carrizo Springs, Texas
1882-Sacred Heart, Cotulla, Texas
1917-Sacred Heart, Crystal City, Texas
1917-St. Joseph, La Pryor, Texas
1918-Immaculate Conception, Asherton, Texas
1966-Sacred Heart, Eagle Pass, Texas
1967-St. Joseph, Eagle Pass, Texas

Schools

High schools
Saint Augustine High School (Diocesan) Founded 1927

Elementary and middle schools
Blessed Sacrament School (Parochial) Founded 1960
Our Lady of Guadalupe School (Diocesan) Founded 1904
Saint Augustine Elementary School (Diocesan) Founded 1928
St. Peter Memorial School (Diocesan) Founded 1925
Mary Help of Christians School (Private) Founded 1935
Our Lady of Refuge School (Eagle Pass, Texas) Web Link (Diocesan) Founded 1883

Media
La Fe magazine
KHOY radio

See also

 Catholic Church by country
 Catholic Church in the United States
 Ecclesiastical Province of San Antonio
 Global organisation of the Catholic Church
 List of Roman Catholic archdioceses (by country and continent)
 List of Roman Catholic dioceses (alphabetical) (including archdioceses)
 List of Roman Catholic dioceses (structured view) (including archdioceses)
 List of the Catholic dioceses of the United States

References

External links 
Roman Catholic Diocese of Laredo Official Site

Roman Catholic Ecclesiastical Province of San Antonio
Christian organizations established in 2000
Culture of Laredo, Texas
Laredo
Laredo
2000 establishments in Texas